"Last Night" is a song recorded by Australian singer and songwriter Ricki-Lee Coulter. It was written by Coulter and Australian DJ Throttle, and was released independently via Black Label Entertainment on 12 June 2020. Upon release the song topped the iTunes chart in Australia.

Background
Coulter announced the single and its release date on 1 June 2020 through Instagram.

"Last Night" is Coulter's first music release in two years, following the 2018 single "Unbothered". In an interview with Sunrise, Coulter announced its release and said "I'm pumped for you to hear this song, it's been a long time coming."

Music forum auspOp described the single as "her returning to her dance/pop roots" with Coulter explaining:"When I toured last year – it reminded me how much my fans love me for uplifting, feel-good music they can dance to. I played the State Theatre in Sydney, which is usually filled with quite a conservative crowd, but after the show they told me they had never seen a crowd jumping up and down and singing like that! And it made me realise I've gotta give the fans what they want, what they love."

Reception

In a review of the song, Women In Pop said 'Last Night' was "a sensuous, low key banger with a pulsing bassline reminiscent of 70s funk married with a multi-layered cascade of electronic beats". Thomas Bleach described the song as "an apocalyptic pop song that radiates love, and explores that pure infatuation that charges through [Ricki-Lee's] veins when she's around [her husband]" and that it "makes you want to hit a crowded dance floor immediately". Out in Perth described it as "a song for our times" and said it's "the kind of dance tune we all love to gear  from the Australian singer".

Track listing

Charts

Release history

References

2020 songs
2020 singles
Ricki-Lee Coulter songs
Songs written by Ricki-Lee Coulter